1985 Comes Alive was a various artists "hits" collection album released in Australia in 1985 on the EMI record Label (Cat No. GIVE 1985). The album spent four weeks at the top of the Australian album charts in 1985.

Track listing

Charts

References

1985 compilation albums
Pop compilation albums
Festival Records compilation albums